The Hughes-Hunter Baronetcy, of Plas Coch in the Parish of Llanedwen in the County of Anglesey, was a title in the Baronetage of the United Kingdom.

It was created on 5 December 1906 for Colonel Charles Hughes-Hunter, a deputy lieutenant, Justice of the peace and fellow of the Royal Society of Edinburgh. Born Charles Hunter, he married Sarah Elizabeth, daughter and heiress of William Bulkeley Hughes, and assumed in 1904 by royal licence the additional surname of Hughes. The title became extinct on the death of the second Baronet in 1951.

Hughes-Hunter baronets, of Plâs Côch (1906)
Col Sir Charles Hughes-Hunter, FRSE 1st Baronet (1844–1907)
Sir William Bulkeley Hughes Hughes-Hunter, 2nd Baronet (1880–1951)

References

Further reading

Extinct baronetcies in the Baronetage of the United Kingdom